The FAI Cup 1935–36 was the fifteenth edition of Ireland's premier cup competition, The Football Association of Ireland Challenge Cup or FAI Cup. The tournament began on 1 January 1936 and concluded on 19 April with the final held at Dalymount Park, Dublin. An official attendance of 30,946 people watched Shamrock Rovers claim their seventh title by defeating Cork.

First round

Second round

Semi-finals

Replay

Final

Notes
A.  From 1923-1936, the FAI Cup was known as the Free State Cup.

B.  Attendances were calculated using gate receipts which limited their accuracy as a large proportion of people, particularly children, attended football matches in Ireland throughout the 20th century for free by a number of means.

C.  Fixture abandoned due to encroachment of spectators. Re-Fixture played on 16 January.

References
General

External links
FAI Website

1935-36
1935–36 in Irish association football
FAI Cup